The following is an alphabetical list of topics related to Cuba.

0–9

.cu – Internet country code top-level domain for Cuba

A
Afro-Cuban All Stars
Álbum de la Revolución Cubana
Americas
North America
North Atlantic Ocean
West Indies
Mar Caribe (Caribbean Sea)
Antillas (Antilles)
Antillas Mayores (Greater Antilles)
Islands of Cuba
Atlantic Ocean
Atlas of Cuba

B
 Danys Báez
 Bay of Buena Vista
 Bay of Pigs Invasion
 Buena Vista Social Club

C

Capital of Cuba:  Ciudad de La Habana (Havana)
Caribbean
Caribbean Sea
Fidel Castro
Raul Castro
Categories:
:Category:Cuba
:Category:Buildings and structures in Cuba
:Category:Communications in Cuba
:Category:Cuba stubs
:Category:Cuba templates
:Category:Cuban composers
:Category:Cuban culture
:Category:Cuban music
:Category:Cuban musicians
:Category:Cuban people
:Category:Cuban singers
:Category:Cuba-related lists
:Category:Economy of Cuba
:Category:Education in Cuba
:Category:Environment of Cuba
:Category:Biota of Cuba
:Category:Fauna of Cuba
:Category:Flora of Cuba
:Category:Energy in Cuba
:Category:Oil and gas companies of Cuba
:Category:Oil fields of Cuba
:Category:Natural history of Cuba
:Category:Fauna of Cuba
:Category:Flora of Cuba
:Category:Nature conservation in Cuba
:Category:Biosphere reserves of Cuba
:Category:National parks of Cuba
:Category:World Heritage Sites in Cuba
:Category:Water supply and sanitation in Cuba
:Category:Aqueducts in Cuba
:Category:Reservoirs in Cuba
:Category:Geography of Cuba
:Category:Government of Cuba
:Category:Health in Cuba
:Category:History of Cuba
:Category:Law of Cuba
:Category:Military of Cuba
:Category:Politics of Cuba
:Category:Science and technology in Cuba
:Category:Society of Cuba
:Category:Sport in Cuba
:Category:Transportation in Cuba
commons:Category:Cuba
Cayo Coco
Cayo Guillermo
Willy Chirino
Ciudad de La Habana (Havana) – Capital of Cuba
Coat of arms of Cuba
Communist Party of Cuba
Confederación Nacional Obrera de Cuba
José Contreras
Silvia Costa
Cuba
The Cuba Libre Story
Cuban Missile Crisis, 1962
Cuban musical theatre
Cuban national baseball system
Cuban National Series
Cuban Revolution, 1953–1959

DEF
Desi Arnaz
Early Cuban bands
"El Himno de Bayamo"
Escambray Mountains

Flag of Cuba

G
Golfo de México
Emeterio González
Juan de Marcos González
Tom Clancy's Ghost Recon: Island Thunder
Greater Antilles
Fabio Grobart
Guanabo
Guantanamo
Gulf of Mexico

H
Havana (Ciudad de La Habana) – Capital of Cuba
Havana Conference
Healthcare in Cuba
History of Cuba
History of Cuban Nationality
Hurricane Dennis
Hurricane Lili

I
International Organization for Standardization (ISO)
ISO 3166-1 alpha-2 country code for Cuba: CU
ISO 3166-1 alpha-3 country code for Cuba: CUB
ISO 3166-2:CU region codes for Cuba
Islands of Cuba:
Cuba island
Canarreos Archipelago
Isla de la Juventud
Ernst Thälmann Island
Cayo Largo del Sur
Cayo Ines de Soto
Colorados Archipelago
Cayo Levisa
Cayo Punta Arenas
Cayo Buenavista
Cayo Santa Maria
Cayo Esquivel
Jardines del Rey
Cayo Guillermo
Cayo Coco
Cayo Romano
Cayo Guajaba
Cayo Sabinal
Cayo Saetia
Jardines de la Reina
Sabana-Camaguey Archipelago
Cayo Cruz del Padre
Cayo Fragoso

JK
 Jardines del Rey Airport
Father José Conrado

L
La Bayamesa
La Habana (Havana) – Capital of Cuba
Laguna de Leche
La Lupe
Last Rumba in Havana
Latin America
Pedro Luis Lazo
Omar Linares
Ernesto Lecuona
LGBT rights in Cuba (Gay rights)
Lists related to Cuba:
Diplomatic missions of Cuba
List of airports in Cuba
List of banks in Cuba
List of Cuba-related topics
List of diplomatic missions in Cuba
List of hospitals in Cuba
List of islands of Cuba
List of Olympic medalists for Cuba
List of rivers of Cuba
Outline of Cuba

M
Mar Caribe
Military of Cuba
Benny Moré
Museums in Cuba
Music of Cuba

N
National anthem of Cuba
North America
North Atlantic Ocean
Northern Hemisphere

O
 Omar Ajete
Outline of Cuba
Omar Linares

PQ
 Pact of Caracas
 Peanut Vendor
 Pico Turquino
 Pinar del Río
 Provinces of Cuba
Quemado De Güines

R
Rita Montaner
Relations between Cuba and the United States
Republic of Cuba (República de Cuba)
 Silvio Rodríguez
 Roots of Hope (Raíces de Esperanza)

S
Sabana-Camaguey Archipelago
Salsa music
Cecilia Samartin
Santa Maria del Mar
Sicko
Sierra Cristal National Park
Moisés Simons
Spanish colonization of the Americas
Spanish Fidelist Group of Cuba
Spanish language
Special Period
Alay Soler

T
Tarara
Teatro de los Elementos
Topes de Collantes
Trinidad
Tropics
Trova
Turquino National Park

U
United Nations founding member state 1945
United States embargo against Cuba
Manuel Urrutia Lleó

V
 Varadero Beach
 Valley de los Ingenios
María Teresa Vera

WXYZ
Water supply and sanitation in Cuba
West Indies
Western Hemisphere

Yoani Sánchez

See also

List of Caribbean-related topics
List of international rankings
Lists of country-related topics
Outline of Cuba
Outline of geography
Outline of North America
United Nations

References

External links

 
Cuba